Music of Coal: Mining Songs from the Appalachian Coalfields is a 70-page book and two CD compilation of old and new music from southern Appalachian coalfields.  The project was produced by Jack Wright and is a benefit for the Lonesome Pine Office on Youth in Wise County, Virginia.

The songs included cover a range of topics related to coal culture such as mining accidents and black lung disease.  Some of the artists are natives of the U.S. coal mining region while others have less direct ties.  Both vintage recordings and contemporary music have been combined with detailed liner notes giving context to both the songs and the artists.  Musicologist Archie Green adds a "Sanctus" note to Wright's "Introduction."

In the preliminary round of nominations for the 50th Grammy Awards the boxed set was under consideration for a number of awards, including, Best Recording Package, Best Liner Notes and Best Historical Album.<ref>"Music of Coal earns Grammy Nominations", Kingsport Times-News, October 6, 2007</ref>  The compilation did not, however, make it the final round of nominees.

 Track listing 
Volume one
 "Down in a Coal Mine (Excerpt)" - 1:25
 The Edison Concert Band
 "Mining Camp Blues" - 2:59
 Trixie Smith
 "Sprinkle Coal Dust on My Grave" - 2:46
 Orville Jenks
 "Coal Miner's Blues" - 3:04
 The Carter Family
 "Hard Times in Coleman’s Mine" - 2:36
 Aunt Molly Jackson
 "He’s Only a Miner Killed in the Ground" - 2:35
 Ted Chestnut
 "Coal Black Mining Blues" - 1:13
 Nimrod Workman
 "‘31 Depression Blues" - 2:52
 Ed Sturgill
 "Prayer of a Miner's Child" - 1:51
 Dock Boggs
 "That Twenty-Five Cents You Paid" - 2:25
 Sarah Ogan Gunning
 "The L & N Don’t Stop Here Anymore" - 3:10 
 Jean Ritchie
 "Dark as a Dungeon" - 1:55
 Merle Travis
 "Come All You Coal Miners" - 2:21 
 The Reel World String Band
 "My Sweetheart’s the Mule in the Mines" - 0:22
 Mike Kline 
 "Thirty Inch Coal" - 2:36
 Hobo Jack Adkins
 "Black Waters" - 3:38
 Jim Ringer
 "Roof Boltin’ Daddy" - 2:26
 Gene Carpenter
 "Dream of a Miner’s Child" - 2:46
 Carter Stanley
 "Coal Miner's Boogie" - 2:57
 George Davis
 "The Yablonski Murder" - 3:00
 Hazel Dickens
 "What Are We Gonna Do?" - 3:01
 Dorothy Myles
 "Explosion at Derby Mine" - 4:02
 Charlie Maggard
 "Blind Fiddler" - 3:05
 Jim “Bud” Stanley
 "Loadin’ Coal" - 2:29
 John Hutchison
 "Coal Town Saturday Night" - 3:06
 Randall Hylton
 "It’s Been a Long Time" - 3:15
 Sonny Houston & Roger Hall
 "Fountain Filled with Blood" - 3:56
 Elder James Caudill & Choir

Volume two
 "West Virginia Mine Disaster" - 2:48
 Molly Slemp
 "Union Man" - 3:36
 Blue Highway
 "Blue Diamond Mines" - 4:26
 Robin & Linda Williams
 "Set Yourself Free" - :50
 Billy Gene Mullins
 "Redneck War" - 5:22
 Ron Short
 "Sixteen Tons" - 2:32
 Ned Beatty
 "There Will Be No Black Lung in Heaven" - 2:05
 Rev. Joe Freeman
 "Deep Mine Blues" - 3:45
 Nick Stump
 "I’m a Coal Mining Man" - 2:22
 Tom T. Hall
 "Dirty Black Coal" - 4:27
 Kenneth Davis
 "Black Lung" - 3:21
 AJ Roach
 "Coal Dust Kisses" - 4:06
 Suzanne Mumpower-Johnson
 "Coal Tattoo" (Billy Edd Wheeler) - 4:06
 Dale Jett
 "A Strip Miner’s Life" - 3:00
 Don Stanley & Middle Creek
 "Daddy’s Dinner Bucket" - 3:26
 Ralph Stanley II
 "In Those Mines" - 3:43
 Valerie Smith
 "Miner’s Prayer" - 3:14
 Ralph Stanley & Dwight Yoakam
 "Dyin’ To Make A Livin’" - 3:47
 W.V. Hill  (of Foddershock)
 "You’ll Never Leave Harlan Alive" - 6:06
 Darrell Scott
 "They Can’t Put It Back" - 2:31
 Jack Wright
 "Which Side Are You On?" - 5:04
 Natalie Merchant

References

Further reading/listening
"Music of Coal rings so true" by Cheryl Truman, Lexington Herald Leader, October 25, 2007
"CD Celebrates Music from the Coal Mines" by Melissa Block, All Things Considered, NPR, September 3, 2007
Archie Green, Only a Miner: Studies in Recorded Coal-Mining Songs'' (University of Illinois Press, 1972).

External links
Music of Coal, official web site
Music of Coal page at the Lonesome Pine Office on Youth

Folk albums by American artists
Regional music compilation albums
Coal mining
2007 compilation albums
Folk compilation albums
Blues compilation albums
Bluegrass compilation albums
Country music compilation albums